Here Comes the Groom is an upcoming Philippine comedy film starring Enchong Dee, Maris Racal, Keempee de Leon and Eugene Domingo. The film is written and directed by Chris Martinez and is under the production of Quantum Films, Cineko Productions and Brightlight Productions. It is one of the official entries for 2023 Metro Manila Summer Film Festival and is set to be released on April 8, 2023. The film is the sequel to the film, Here Comes the Bride released in 2010, also written and directed by Martinez.

Background
Due to the success of the film Here Comes the Bride in 2010, the writer and director the film decided to proceed for a sequel and conceptualized this film in mid-2022. The script was submitted to the Metro Manila Development Authority in January 2023 and was finally announced as one of the entries for the first Summer edition of Metro Manila Film Festival on February 24, 2023. Proceeds from the said filmfest will go to a number of beneficiaries in the film industry including the Movie Workers Welfare Foundation Inc., Motion Picture and Anti-Film Piracy Council, Film Development Council of the Philippines, and the Optical Media Board. The first trailer of the film was released on March 3, 2023. The cast are set to attend the Parade of Stars which is set to be held in Quezon City on April 2, 2023, as mandated by the MMDA.

Plot
The film follows the story of six individuals who swap souls and try to figure out how to return to their bodies.

Cast
Enchong Dee
Maris Racal
Keempee de Leon
Eugene Domingo
Miles Ocampo
Tony Labrusca
Xilhouete
Kaladkaren
Awra Briguela
Gladys Reyes
Nico Antonio
Iyah Mina
Fino Herrera
Kim Atienza

References

2023 films
2023 comedy films
Filipino-language films
Films directed by Chris Martinez
Philippine comedy films